Graeme Thomson (born 1951) is an Australian former professional tennis player.

Born in Sydney, Thomson was active on tour in the 1970s and had a best singles world ranking of 162. He featured in the second round of the Australian Open on three occasions, including the 1974 tournament when he lost to Jimmy Connors, who went on to win his first grand slam title.

Thomson played Bundesliga tennis for Solingen and married a German. Their son Clinton was a tennis player.

References

External links
 
 

1951 births
Living people
Australian male tennis players
Tennis players from Sydney
Australian expatriate sportspeople in Germany